Hani (born Hani Adnan Al-Bader) is a Kuwaiti / American record producer and remixer based in New York, notable for his restructurings of hits by artists ranging from Michael Jackson to Alicia Keys, as well as his original productions. His 1999 release, "Baby Wants to Ride", reached number 1 on the US Billboard Hot Dance Music/Club Play chart. His work has led to a collaboration with DJ Frankie Knuckles, as well as vocalists Jason Walker, Andrea Martin, Faith Trent, and others.

History 

In 1984 Hani back home in Kuwait was a bedroom DJ recording mixed cassette tapes. By 1988 during his college years in Denver Hani became a professional DJ at several major clubs. Saved enough money to purchase used Synthesizers,  Drum Machines and 4 track tape from pawn shops. Hani learned on his own the art of making Electronic Dance Music and was able to release few underground records. In 1993 Hani got his start doing underground Acid House tracks for Carl Craig's Label Planet-e & Deep Dish's label Yoshitoshi. Soon after Hani decided to go to New York to study audio engineering.

By 1994 Hani was enrolled in the Institute of Audio Research in New York City. There he gained knowledge of the fundamentals of audio acoustics, electronic circuitry, engineering and mixing. While attending the institute Hani applied at Bass Hit Studios for an intern job. It was at Bass Hit Studios that Hani acquired a deeper sense of Electronic Dance Music by working for such House music luminaries as Masters at Work (Little Louie Vega & Kenny Dope), Roger Sanchez and Danny Tenaglia. Hani cleaned the studio after them, picked up the garbage and delivered food however, he also learned the basics of House arrangements and mixing. While doing so Hani started his remix career working on projects for Artists such as Deee-Lite, Repercussions & Urban Soul. 

The competition in New York City was very high and Hani had to quickly make a name for himself therefore, he did not follow the rules. He did not wait for record labels to give him a chance at remixing songs he liked. He chose songs he gravitated to and went on to produce his remixes in his studio without being commissioned. His 1995 unauthorized remix of Sade's “I Never Thought I’d See the Day” under the alias Musk Men got him the exposure he’d been waiting for. It was bootlegged by several labels in the US and Europe and gave Hani a Jump-start. Sade, however, was not into remixes so never got an official release.  Then came Hani’s unauthorized remix of Sting‘s  “Sister Moon”, which was also bootlegged. Due to its success, this remix got official approval and was released by A&M.

Hani's passion for creating music became a steadfast career in the summer of 1996 with the release of his first No:1 Billboard production “Soul To Bare” with house diva Joi Cardwell. Moreover, Hani went on to produce another international hit “That Look” by Delacy. Both where featured by Pete Tong on BBC Radio 1.

Hani kept on working & releasing several official remixes for various independent dance labels until in 1996 Hani decide to work on an unauthorized remix of Michael Jackson's “Earth Song”. Frankie Knuckles played Hani's remix on both radios and in clubs. One afternoon Hani recalls ” I got contacted by a big Sony executive to inform me of how much MJ and the label loves the remix and how excited they are to release it worldwide. “Earth Song” went on to become No:1 for six weeks on the UK singles chart. 3 months later Hani got commissioned to remix MJ's  “Stranger in Moscow”.

One of the great rewards of Hani's newfound recognition was an invitation to collaborate with the Frankie Knuckles on a remix project. “He’s one person who impressed me because there’s a certain sound in what he does that I think is interesting. I like the touch that he has“, Frankie acknowledges.

1997 saw the birth of hit remixes like Jay-Z's “Can’t Knock The Hustle” and the unauthorized mix of “Rocket Man” by Elton John. Remix and production offers from major artists and labels started pouring down from all directions, Hani was a very busy man working from his basement studio.  His remixes for Amber “One More Night” and Deborah Cox “I Never Knew” were major radio hits on heavy rotation across the US. True to Hani's style, Arista records had no plans for Deborah's song until Hani decided on his own to transform the slow balled/album filler track into a major dance hit. In 1999 Hani decided to remind his early fans of his love for underground club music by producing the hit “Baby Wants To Ride” which went on to become Number 1 on the Billboard Club chart.

Hani's steady attention and effort toward his remix projects had earned him a reputation among the dance music ranks and that year witnessed the creation of such hits as “Drugs Are Bad” Hani vs. South Park, “Share the Love” by Andrea Martin and “Tuva Groove” by Ondar was an Essential tune on Pete Tongs Show.

By the year 2000 success of remixes such as “There You Go”  by Pink and “Glorious“Andreas Johnson cemented Hani’s position as one of the top remixers in the US.  Although he is increasingly well known by record labels with each project, Hani insists on transforming tracks on his initiative.

By 2003, Hani became one of the top electronic music producers. He went on to officially remix some of today's top international artists.

The next year, Hani produced his third track to reach Number 1 on a Billboard chart, “Foolish Mind Games” with vocalist Jason Walker. By 2005 Hani completed and released over 167 remixes.

After ten years of producing & remixing for various labels, Hani decided to start his record label to claim 100% of copyright ownership and publishing. He established Soterios Records in 2006 during a time when downloading music from the Internet caused most major record companies to take a nose-dive in sales.

Soterios features his collaborative efforts with singers such as Grammy Nominated Singer Song Writer Andrea Martin, Roland Clark, Alex Moulton, GRAMMAR, & Virgin Killer. Hani writes, produces & programs almost 100% of his label's releases under names such as Antigen, Disconffect, Jack Shaft, Miles BlackLove, Magnetic Fields Forever, Extra Sauce & Ridikulous Kool.  Soterios Records is currently on various online platforms including Beatport, Traxsource, Spotify and iTunes.

Remixography
 Deee-Lite – "Picnic in The Summertime" Elektra 1994
 Deee-Lite – "Say Ahh" Elektra 1994
 Deee-Lite – "Call Me" Elektra 1994
 Repercussions – "Promise Me Nothing" Reprise 1994
 Urban Soul – "Until We Meet Again "King Street 1995
 Technique – "This Old House" King Street 1995
 Sade – "I Never Thought I’d See The Day" White Label 1995
 Sinéad O'Connor – "Thank You" EMI 1995 (Unreleased)
 Sting – "Sister Moon" AM-PM 1995
 Ziggy Marley – "Power To Move Ya" Elektra 1995
 Danny Tenaglia – "Look Ahead" Tribal 1995
 Projection – "Heart & Soul" DMC 1995
 De'Lacy – "Hideaway" DMC 1995
 Ruffneck – "Everybody Be Somebody" MAW 1995
 Kathy Sledge – "Another Day" Narcotic 1995
 Nu Solution – "I Need You" Narcotic 1995
 Michael Jackson – "Earth Song" Epic 1995
 S.O.S. Band – "Borrowed Love" DMC 1995
 Cassio – "I Like You" Easy Street 1995
 Simply Red – "Fairground" DMC 1995
 Prince – "Solo" White 1995
 Pebbles – "Like The Last Time" MCA 1995
 Michael Jackson – "Earth Song" Epic 1995
 Angela Lewis – "Dream Come True" Groovilicious 1996
 De'Lacy – "That Look" Deconstruction 1996
 The Shangri-Las – "Give Him a Great Big Kiss" Columbia 1996
 Black Saints – "The First Day" Emotive 1996
 Lolita – "Cocaine" Emotive 1996
 Buzz – "Faith in Love" Iron 1996
 Djaimin – "Finally" Slip & Slide 1996
 Jean Michel Jarre – "Oxygene 8" Sony 1996
 Shawn Christopher – "Don't Lose The Magic" DMC 1996
 Mariah Carey – "Looking In" White Label 1996
 Massimo Di Cataldo – "Anim Rou" Sony 1996
 Reel 2 Real – "Muave La Cadera" Positiva 1996
 Elton John – "Rocket Man" MCA 1996
 Hondi – "Hondi No Access" Manifesto 1996
 Jay-Z & Mary J. Blige – "Can't Knock the Hustle" BMG 1996
 Michael Jackson – "Stranger In Moscow" Epic 1997
 Acacia – "Maddening Shroud" WEA 1997
 Skunk Anansie – "Brazen" One little Indian 1997
 Myndy K – "Love From Above" Strictly Rhythm 1997
 Amber – "One More Night" Tommy Boy 1997
 Cyndi Lauper – "Sisters of Avalon" Epic 1997 Unreleased
 Savage Garden – "To the Moon and Back" Columbia 1997
 Lisa Stansfield – "Never Never Gonna Give You Up" Arista 1997
 Transglobal Underground – "Eyeway Souljah" MCA 1997
 Crystal Waters – "Momma Told Me" Mercury 1997
 Pink Floyd vs. Underworld – "Brown Acid" White Label 97'
 Todd Terry – "Ready For A New Day" Manifesto 1997
 Brainbug – "Rain" Groovilicious 98'
 War of the Worlds – "The Eve of The War" Sony 98'
 Veronica – "Release Me" Hola 1998
 Ace of Base – "Cruel Summer" Arista 1998
 Mono – "Slimcia Girl" Mercury 1998
 Pink Floyd – "Brain Damage/Lunatic" White Label 1999
 Andrea Martin – "Share The Love" Arista 1999
 Anggun – "Secret Of The Sea" White Label 99'
 Eric Benet – "Georgy Porgy" WB 1999
 Judy Albanese – "You" Contagious 1999
 Ondar – "Tuva Groove" F111 1999
 Deborah Cox – "I Never Knew" Arista 1999
 Pink – "There You Go" La Face 1999
 DJ Rap – "Bad Girl" Columbia 2000
 Rare Blend – "Boom Boom Boom" Curb 2000
 ZINC – "Somebody Found Love" Nervous 2000
 Andreas Johnson – "Glorious" Warner/Kinetic 2000
 Changing Faces – "That Other Woman" Atlantic 2000
 The Beatles – "Eleanor Rigby" White Label 2001
 Backstreet Boys – "More Than That" Jive 2001
 Svala – "Real Me" Priority 2001
 Pru – "Aaroma" Capitol 2001
 Busta Rhymes – "Pass The Courvoisier" J records 2002
 Jewel – "Serve The Ego" Atlantic 2002
 Justin Timberlake – "Cry Me a River" Jive 2003
 Christina Aguilera – "Fighter" RCA 2003
 Lucy Woodward – "Blindsided" Atlantic 2003
 Kelly Clarkson – "Miss Independent"
 Justin Timberlake – "Senorita" Jive 2003
 Kindred – "Faraway From Here" HiddenBeach 2003
 America – "You Can Do Magic" White Label 2003
 Elton John – "Are You Ready" Ultra 2003
 Brandy (singer) – "Who Is She 2 U" Atlantic 2004
 Alicia Keys – "Diary" J Records 2004
 Dido – "Sand in My Shoes" Arista 2004
 Fabolous – "Baby" Atlantic 2005
 Fabolous – "Tit 4 Tat" Atlantic 2005
 Missy Elliott – "Lose Control" Atlantic 2005
 Rob Thomas – "This Is How a Heart Breaks" Atlantic 2005 (Unreleased)
 Katie Melua – "Just Like Heaven" Columbia 2005
 Natasha Bedingfield – "Unwritten" Epic 2005
 Lil Kim – "Lighters Up" Atlantic 2005
 Pink – "Stupid Girls" Jive 2006
 Christina Milian – "Say I" DefJam/Island 2006
 Ian Nieman pres. Liquid Sunshine – "He’d Never Do" Nervous 2006
 Jesus Jackson – "Running On Sunshine" Southern Fried.2006
 Justin Timberlake – "My Love" Jive 2006
 Christina Aguilera – "Hurt" RCA 2006
 Idina Menzel – "Defying Gravity"
 Alanis Morissette – "Not as We" WB 2008
 Anna Tsuchiya – "Bubble Trip" 2008
 Groove Armada – "Get Down" Strictly Rhythm 2008
 Avril Lavigne – "Hot" 2008
 Fleetwood Mac – "Big Love" UR 2008
 Christina Aguilera – "Keeps Getting Better" RCA 2008
 Mariah Carey – "I Want to Know What Love Is" DefJam 2009
 Dallas Cowboys Cheerleaders – "Power Squad Bod!" MTV 2009
 Donni Hotwheel – "Da Monsta Mash" White 2009
 Rihanna – "Russian Roulette" DefJam 2009
 Shontelle – "Licky" Motown 2010
 New Boyz – "You're a Jerk" WB 2010
 Britney Spears – "Megamix" Jive 2010
 Iyaz – "Replay" Reprise 2009
 Michael Bublé – "Haven't Met You Yet" Reprise 2010
 Kimberley Locke – "Strobelight" Dream Merchant 2010
 Mishal AlArouj – "Louma" AiwaGulf 2010
 Sade Vs. Dennis Ferrer – "Long Hard Transitions" UR 2010
 Chillie Gonzales vs. D. Portman – "Crying Cerberus" UR 2010
 Chillie Gonzales vs. Rober Babics – "Dark Crying Flower" UR 2011
 Sade vs. Henrick Schwarz – "Pearls & Headphones" UR 2011
 Radiohead Vs. Dennis Ferrer – "The Codex Room" UR 2011
 Andrea Martin Vs. Dennis Ferrer – "I still Love Touch The Sky" UR 2011

Discography
 Hani – "Tranq Me" Planet E 1993
 Veggie Grooves – "Jeep Warehouse Beats Vol. 1" SDc 1993
 Hani – "North Seeking Project ep." King Street 1994
 Hani – "N.Y.C. Me High" Planet E 1994
 Hani – "Victim of Circumtrance" YoshiToshi 1995
 Faders Inc. – "Up’n Down" YoshiToshi 1996
 Plaza 3 – "E-vening, Mooshoo" Emotive 1996
 Joi Cardwell – "Soul To Bare" Eight Ball 1996
 Hani – "Baby wants to Ride" Groovilicious 1998
 Time Square 2000 – "The Beginning" Groovilicious 1999
 Hani vs. South Park – "Drugs Are Bad" White Label 1999
 MFF – "Born to Synthesize" Groovilicious 1999
 MFF feat: Andrea Martin – "The More I Love You" Groovilicious 2001
 Hani feat. Faith Trent – "Foolish Mind Games" 2002
 Knight Keys – "Never Felt this Way" Yoshitoshi 2003
 HaNi – "I Feel Dub" UR 1995
 Jason Walker – "Foolish Mind Games" JVM 2004
 Disconfect Feat: Andrea Martin – "Story of my Life" Robbins 2005
 Donna Summer – "Power of Love" J records 2005

Soterios Records
 Miles Black Love – "All I Want" 
 Hani & Roland Clark – "Must Be That Sound" 2005
 Kristine W. – "Letting Go" 2006
 Raw Sextacy – "Sextacy" 2006
 Antigen Feat Andrea Martin – "So What" 2006
 Jesus Juice – "I Am Coming" 2006
 LBN – "Look Better Naked" 2006
 Miles Black Love – "Turn It Loose" 2006
 Jack Shaft – "SuperLogical" 2006
 Hani & Andrea Martin – "Middle Of The Night" 2006
 Extra Sauce – "My Rocket" 2006
 Beethoven On LSD – "We Are Nothing" 2007
 Miles Black Love – "All I Want & Need" 2007
 Hani – "No More" 2008
 Extra Sauce – "This Healing Feeling" 2008
 Hani Feat Andrea Martin – "No More" 2008
 Tonearm & Jack Shaft – "Hunter – Gatherer" 2008
 Hani & Andrea Martin – "No More" 2008
 Hani Feat Virgin Killer – "What R U Waiting 4" 2009
 Jack Shaft – "You Make Me Happy" 2010
 Ridiculous Kool – "Keep It Kool" 2010
 Hani & Kristine W. – "Letting Go" 2010
 Extra Sauce – "Let Me Toss Your Salad" 2011
 Jack Shaft – "Chimibanga" 2011
 Miles Black Love – "They Won’t Go" 2011
 Hani & Andrea Martin – "Middle Of The Night" 2012
 Hani feat. Fred Merk – "Must Be That Body Language" 2013
 A Napadol – "Chant 420" 2013
 Extra Sauce – "On  Way" 2013
 Miles Black Love – "Someday" 2013
 Ridikulous Kool – "Kool Loops" 2013
 Hani feat. Fred Merk – "Must Be That Body Language" 2013
 Antigen Feat Andrea Martin – "So What" 2013
 Magnetic Fields Forever – "Oxygene" 2014
 Miles Black Love – "Believe" 2014
 Brooklyn SafeHouse – "Morning Sweetness" 2014
 HaNi Feat Andrea Martin – "Higher Ground" 2015
 DJ Moist – "Take My Time" 2015
 Jack Shaft Feat Lloyd Popp – "Tears" 2015
 HaNi Feat Faith Trent – "Foolish Mind Games" 2015

See also
 List of number-one dance hits (United States)
 List of artists who reached number one on the US Dance chart

References

External links
 Official website
 YouTube account
 Beatport
 Hani profile at e.discogs

American dance musicians
American house musicians
Remixers
Year of birth missing (living people)
Living people
Kuwaiti emigrants to the United States
Kuwaiti musicians